Piyachart Phalanglit (born June 15, 1997) is a Thai professional footballer who plays as a midfielder for Thai League 1 club Police Tero.

References

External links
 

1997 births
Living people
Piyachart Phalanglit
Piyachart Phalanglit
Piyachart Phalanglit
Association football midfielders